The 2010–11 Saint Peter's Peacocks men's basketball team represented Saint Peter's College during the 2010–11 NCAA Division I men's basketball season. The Peacocks, led by fifth year head coach John Dunne, played their home games at the Yanitelli Center and were members of the Metro Atlantic Athletic Conference. They finished the season 20–14, 11–7 in MAAC play to finish in fourth place. They defeated Loyola (MD), Fairfield, and Iona to win the MAAC tournament. As a result, the received the conference's automatic bid to the NCAA tournament as the No. 14 seed in the Southwest region where they lost to Purdue in the second round (formerly and now known as the First Round).

Previous season 
The Peacocks finished the 2009–10 season 16–14, 11–7 in MAAC play to finish in fourth place. They lost in the quarterfinals of the MAAC tournament to Rider.

Roster

Schedule and results

|-
!colspan=9 style=| Regular season

|-
!colspan=9 style=|MAAC tournament

|-
!colspan=9 style=|NCAA tournament

References

Saint Peter's
Saint Peter's
Saint Peter's Peacocks men's basketball seasons
Saint Peter's Peacocks basketball
Saint Peter's Peacocks basketball